Días De Gloria is the first live-album by the Spanish power metal band Avalanch, recorded during the promotional tour of Llanto De Un Héroe in Avilés 1999 and released in 2000. Includes a bonus track which is a studio version of Save Me a song by the band Queen.

Track listing 
 All songs by Alberto Rionda, Except 3 and 11 (Víctor García)

 "Intro" 01:48
 "Torquemada" 06:26
 "Por Mi Libertad" 06:06
 "Pelayo" 07:16
 "Vientos Del Sur" 06:54
 "Polvo, Sudor Y Sangre" 01:05
 "Cid" 05:11
 "¿Dias De Gloria...?" 06:01
 "I Want Out" (Helloween Cover) 04:08
 "Cambaral" 06:07
 "Aquí Estaré" 05:27
 "Llanto De Un Héroe" 05:04

2000 live albums
Avalanch albums